This list of 2008 motorsport champions is a list of national or international auto racing series with a Championship decided by the points or positions earned by a driver from multiple races.

Formula cars

Kart

Sports car

Stock car

Touring car

Sprint car racing

Rallying

Rally raid

Drag racing

Hillclimb

Historic racing

Ice racing

Short Course Off Road Racing

Desert Off Road Racing

Rallycross

Drifting

Truck racing

Tractor Pulling

Formula off-road

Dirt Trial

Alternative Energy racing

Time Attack

Autocross

Autotest

Motorkhana

Sprint

Trials

Cross country

Motorcycle

Road racing

Motocross

Enduro

Trials

Supercross

Freestyle Motorcross

Arenacross

Drag racing

Rally raid

Desert Off-Road Racing

Supermoto

Flat track

Speedway

Ice speedway

ATV Motorcross

Hillclimb

Snowmobile racing

Water surface racing

Air racing

See also
 List of motorsport championships
 Auto racing

External links

 Champions
2008